Ovalipes catharus, commonly known as paddle crab and , is a species of crab of the family Portunidae. It is found around the coasts of New Zealand, the Chatham Islands, and in south-eastern parts of Australia.

Identification 
At first glance, Ovalipes catharus appear to be fairly similar to many other crabs. Paddle crabs have a hard shell, or carapace and ten legs, five to each side. The first set of legs of the crab is tipped with large claws. The claws of the paddle crab are fairly long and narrow and are curled in a sickle shape. They are decapods which means they have 10 legs and are situated symmetrically with five legs on each side. The claws are also serrated with large points on the insides. The carapace, or shell, of the crab can range from pale orange to light gray, and can be spotted with brown and red. The carapace is a rough oval shape, and the front end has five teeth to either side of the eyes. Paddle crabs can reach sizes ranging from 100–140 mm across the shell upon reaching maturity. Unlike some other crab species, the last pair of legs of this crab is flattened into a paddle, hence their name. These paddles are also colored blue, and sometimes have a purple tinge, making them distinctive in color from the rest of the body. Unlike prawns and lobsters which have narrow bodies with long tails, paddle crabs have also developed a wide body (carapace) and very short tail (abdomen), which is usually tucked underneath to its body making it compact and wide.

Geographic distribution and habitat
Paddle crab (O. catharus) found to be quite a unique species to which is native to New Zealand and Australia. Paddle crabs are often active swimmers, but if they are not active, they normally bury themselves underneath the sand. There are hundreds of species worldwide, showing that they are common throughout New Zealand, and species found in different areas have turned up in New Zealand, mainly in warmer waters to the North, and have made themselves at home when they invade either naturally or accidentally by ship. Ships need to pump water to keep them balanced, however many marine species like paddle crabs have tiny larvae in their life cycle, where they might get sucked into ballast tanks and get pumped out again when the ship reaches a destination. If they survive, the larvae would grow to become an adult in its new home. According to all records in 2003 from the ‘Aquatic Sciences and Fisheries’ Ovalipes catharus were locally found on open sandy beaches, in surf areas and open coast. Adults are relatively distributed throughout mainland New Zealand, Stewart Island and Chatham Island from intertidal to more than 10 meters with size maturity varies geographically, i.e., those from the Tasman Bay maturing smaller with carapace 50mm width, compared to those from the Pegasus Bay, 65mm. 
However, fishery reports of this species from Stewart Island were thought to be misidentified as Nectocarcinus spp. and so, research bottom trawl records (trawl database) and some other electronic databases, recRamp, CELR, AllSeaBio database were created to record all crabs of this type (i.e., O.catharus) with at least 55mm carapace width taken to be the minimum adult size. Therefore, analysis will provide specific database for ‘Seafood New Zealand’ and for estimate distribution of the species throughout New Zealand Coastal regions.

Diet, prey and predators

Diet and foraging  
Paddle crabs consume a wide variety of organisms.  Much of their diet is made up of mollusks and crustaceans, but they have also been observed catching and eating fish as well. Crabs have been found to consume vegetative tissues that they find while they are foraging in the sediment. Cannibalism of smaller crabs occurs as well, especially in the winter when other food sources are more limited. Some larger crabs are also cannibalized as well, especially if they have recently moulted, and are lacking the hard outer shell. Paddle crabs hunt in several ways. The crabs spend much of their time scavenging for food in the sediment layers, but will also actively hunt fish, shrimp and other creatures.  The flattened hind legs of the crab allow them to swim rapidly, which aid them in catching faster prey. These paddles also allow the crabs swim in water up to 10 meters deep, giving them a larger hunting range than other crab species that can be limited to shallow water. The crab’s claws are also extremely important for their success in hunting. Not only can they be used to catch fish, but the claws are extremely important for accessing other prey as well. These crabs are very good at harvesting mussels and other bivalves, In order to get to the soft flesh inside, the paddle crab can either pry the shell of the mussels open with its claws, or in the case of smaller mussels, the crab’s claws are strong enough to crush the shell.  With all of these tools at its disposal, the paddle crab is one of the more dominant predators of the intertidal zone.

Predators, parasites, and diseases 
Large fish such as dogfish and snapper make up the majority of the predators that usually prey upon Ovalipes catharus. Along with these predatory fish, larger crabs can also cannibalize younger paddle crabs. When it comes to parasites, nematodes and bryozoans are the main groups that parasitize these crabs. These parasites reach the highest density on mature crabs that no longer moult.  However, the type and intensity of parasitism can differ depending on the setting that the crab is living. In a study looking at the crossing over of parasites between native and invasive crabs, it appears that Ovalipes catharus has not been affected by new parasites brought by invasive species. Since paddle crabs come in contact with an invasive species of crab, Charybdis japonica, they risk being exposed to new parasites brought by the invasive species that they have little to no resistance to.  However, in the study when comparing crabs caught in the same site, there were no similar parasites between the species.

Life cycle and phenology
Paddle crabs usually mate sometime between May and November. This time is variable from colony to colony. The temperature and abundance of food are two of the factors that affect the timing that spawning occur. In a colony, spawning can either be synchronized, or can be spread out throughout the entire breeding season. In order to breed, the female crab must be soft shelled, which also plays a role in the variety of spawning times. Before the female molts male crabs have been observed to carry them underneath their body for up to eight days prior. Once the crabs have spawned, the female incubates the eggs until they hatch. After the eggs hatch, the newborn crabs emerge in their first larval phase.  Paddle crabs go through eight zoea phases, which all occurs in deeper water offshore. Once the zoea phase is complete the young paddle crabs entire the megalopa phase, which usually occurs between January and May. After this final larval stage is complete, the crabs will continue to grow through moulting. Unlike the moulting that occurred in the larval stage, moulting as an adult doesn’t change the morphology of the crab, it simply lets it reach a larger size. After roughly 10–13 moults the crab will reach maturity. This usually takes 3–4 years, but when food is limited it can take longer to reach maturity. The time it takes for a crab to mature can also be affected by the environment: crabs living in warmer waters grow faster and breed more often than crabs in cooler conditions.

Other information
Paddle crabs have a reputation for being very aggressive and are known to pinch swimmers on occasion. It can be fairly easy to come in contact with the crabs, since their preferences for sandy beaches put them into a similar area as many vacationers. The population of paddle crabs is believed to be increasing in recent years as their predator numbers decrease due to over-fishing. However, formal studies haven’t been done to quantify the crab’s population over time, so much of the evidence is merely opinion based. Paddle crabs have caught in large numbers and sold commercially in recent years. With much of the catch occurring off the course of the North Island, paddle crab has become increasing important economically. However, since the exact population isn’t known, there is some worries that overfishing could occur. Also, the non-commercial catch isn’t known either, which also could also have a long-term effect on the sustainability of the paddle crab harvest. Since much of the paddle crab habitat is close to shore, they are fairly easy for recreational fishermen to catch.  The paddle crab is known for having meat with both good flavor and texture, which contributes to a large amount of its market success. Ovalipes catharus has also been observed to be highly migratory in an experiment that tagged a number of crabs. This means that populations in New Zealand aren’t likely to be genetically diverse.

References

Portunoidea
Crustaceans of the Pacific Ocean
Crustaceans described in 1843
Taxa named by Adam White (zoologist)